Rolla Kent Beattie (1875–1960) was an American botanist and plant pathologist.

Biography

Early life and education
Beattie was born in Ashland, Ohio, in 1875. He attended Cotner University, where he received a Bachelor of Arts degree in 1895. He also attended the University of Nebraska, where he received a Bachelor of Science degree in 1896 and a Master of Arts degree in 1898.

Career
Beattie was a teacher at high schools in Colorado and Wyoming until 1899, when he joined the Washington State College as an instructor of botany. Along with beginning his work on studying plant diseases at WSC, he studied plant life in Washington, Idaho, and the Northwest coast of the United States together with Charles Vancouver Piper. He became the department head and botanist at the Agricultural Experiment Station of the college after Piper left the position.

Beattie went on to work for the Federal Horticultural Board, the Bureau of Plant Industry at the United States Department of Agriculture, during which he was involved in the development of plant inspection procedures. He also studied chestnut blight and Dutch elm disease. After his retirement in 1945, Beattie took up studying the Pacific Northwest plant pioneer David Douglas, but was unable to finish his studies due to poor health.

Beattie died in 1960.

References

American botanists
University of Nebraska–Lincoln alumni
Washington State University faculty
United States Department of Agriculture officials
American phytopathologists
People from Ashland, Ohio
1875 births
1960 deaths